Norman Henry Snaith (1898–1982) was a British Old Testament scholar and a professor at Wesley College, Leeds.

Education and early life
Snaith was the son of a Primitive Methodist minister. He was educated at Manchester Grammar School and Corpus Christi College, Oxford, reading mathematics before studying Semitic languages under George Buchanan Gray at Mansfield College.

Career
Snaith became a Primitive Methodist minister, taking up pastoral work until appointed Professor of Old Testament at Wesley College in 1936. He became Principal of Wesley College in 1954, and retired in 1961. In 1957, Snaith was president of the Society for Old Testament Study.

Publications by Snaith
 Studies in the Psalter, 1934
 The distinctive ideas of the Old Testament, 1944
 Notes on the Hebrew text of 2 Samuel, XVI-XIX (Study Notes on Bible Books), 1945
 The Book of Job (Study Notes on Bible Books), 1945
 Notes on the Hebrew text of Job, I-VI (Study Notes on Bible Books), 1945
 The Psalms; a short introduction (Study Notes on Bible Books), 1945
 Notes on the Hebrew text of Isaiah, chapters XXVIII-XXXII (Study Notes on Bible Books), 1945
 Notes on the Hebrew text of Jeremiah, chapters III, VII and XXXI (Study Notes on Bible Books), 1945
 Notes in the Hebrew text of Jonah (Study Notes on Bible Books), 1945
 The Book of Amos; pt. 1: Introduction (Study Notes on Bible Books), 1946
 The Book of Amos; pt. 2: Translation and notes (Study Notes on Bible Books), 1946
 Notes on the Hebrew text of Genesis I-VIII (Study Notes on Bible Books), 1947
 The Jewish New Year festival, 1948
 The Jews from Cyrus to Herod, 1949
 Notes on the Hebrew text of Genesis XL-XLIV (Study Notes on Bible Books), 1950
 Hymns of the Temple, 1951
 Mercy and sacrifice; a study of the book of Hosea, 1953
 Notes on the Hebrew Text of I Kings XVII–XIX and XXI–XXII (Study Notes on Bible Books), 1954
 Amos, Hosea and Micah (Epworth Preacher's Commentaries), 1956
 (editor) Hebrew Old Testament, 1958
 Leviticus and Numbers (The Century Bible, New Edition), 1967
 The Book of Job; its origin and purpose, 1968

References

1898 births
1982 deaths
British Methodists
Methodist ministers
Old Testament scholars
People educated at Manchester Grammar School
Alumni of Corpus Christi College, Oxford
Presidents of the Society for Old Testament Study